P. edulis may refer to:
 Passiflora edulis, a plant species cultivated commercially in frost-free areas for its fruit
 Phyllostachys edulis, a bamboo species
 Pinus edulis, a pine species
 Plectranthus edulis, an annual plant species
 Plinia edulis, the cambucá, a tree species found in Brazil
 Pueraria edulis, a plant species belonging to the genus Pueraria
 Pyxicephalus edulis, the edible bullfrog, a frog species

Synonyms 
 Paeonia edulis, a synonym for Paeonia lactiflora, the Chinese peony or common garden peony, a herbaceous perennial flowering plant species native to central and eastern Asia from eastern Tibet across northern China to eastern Siberia

See also 
 Edulis (disambiguation)